is a fictional character and protagonist in the You're Under Arrest franchise. Her voice was provided by Akiko Hiramatsu (Japanese), and Jo Ann Luzzatto (English; OVA) & Juliet Cesario (English; onward). In the live action version, she was portrayed by Sachie Hara.

Fictional biography
Miyuki is Natsumi's partner and roommate. Miyuki is not as physically challenging as Natsumi, but she is much more thoughtful and more polite. A technical genius, Miyuki frequently performs custom vehicle modifications for various people at the precinct and is an expert with computers. Miyuki is a superb driver, almost as daring as Natsumi, and very difficult to shake in a pursuit. She is also punctual, shy, and diligent – in contrast, Natsumi is tardy, bold, and frequently lazy. Her mini patrol car, a Honda Today, is a heavily modified version for patrol duties. Starting with Today's 545 cc EH engine, Miyuki has stroked it out to 600 cc and turbocharged as well as converted to DOHC. Later she swaps the engine to a 700 cc stroked version of the later 656 cc MTREC engine (although still having a yellow number plate for K-cars), also with twin cams, a turbocharger, an intercooler, and nitrous oxide boost. She also has a blue Toyota Sports 800 as her car.

Unlike Natsumi's infatuation towards the chief (Kachou) of Traffic Division, Miyuki admires and respects him because of his dedication in working with the division. During situations where force was the only solution, Miyuki uses airsoft guns with paintball bullets in order to incapacitate or to leave a homing beacon on the opponents. Her love interest happens to be with the "White Hawk" Ken Nakajima but has initial difficulty in telling him until the end of the series. Her feelings for Ken were driven to the point when she pointed an air gun on Natsumi's head when she joked that she would have to marry Ken in the future.

Miyuki is fearful of anything that cannot be explained by science, such as the Paranormal, Supernatural or anything that was similar to science fiction. She is also afraid of reptiles.

Her character design was also used as the template for a goddess whom the characters prayed to in a four panel gag strip added to a version of YUA who eventually became Belldandy when the strip proved popular and was developed into Oh! My Goddess.

History
According to the information in the You're Under Arrest series, Miyuki was born on April 7, 1976. She had previously lived in the Okayama Prefecture before moving to the Greater Tokyo Area and entered the Metropolitan Police Department Academy and was classmates with Natsumi Tsujimoto before being transferred to Bokuto Station. She resides currently in Kōtō, Tokyo alongside Natsumi.

When she was trying to pick up Natsumi, she met with her instead by luck when seeing her breaking some of traffic violation rules (to the point that her driving license can be suspended) but she knew at once that she's Natsumi, her partner to be. Eventually catching up with her, Miyuki made a first impression with her and after Natsumi's transfer to Bokuto Station was complete, Miyuki and Natsumi became partners in the station's Traffic Division. The two became famous with Miyuki's brains and Natsumi's fists in solving various cases involving either themselves or with their colleagues. Miyuki was the other half of the duo responsible for ground breaking work in dismantling a mysterious car smuggling syndicate operation in Tokyo, resulting in her subsequent transfer to the Tokyo Metropolitan Police Department's Criminal Investigation Bureau  under its Scientific Investigations Laboratory. The Lab invited her to permanently transfer to the department, but she refused the offer.

In the Hachi-Ichi-Go (蜂一号) crisis (Bee Number One in the dub of You're Under Arrest: The Movie), Miyuki's expertise in computers and in electronics have managed to gain breakwork during initial investigations over the mysterious power outages in the Sumida Ward, but was not able to secure any details regarding them. Nearing the end of the movie, she and Natsumi apprehend renegade officer Tadashi Emoto after wounding Kachou as a means of "proving" that he acted alone throughout the crisis. Miyuki was sent to Los Angeles with Natsumi as part of a foreign police officer exchange program for a short time with the Los Angeles Police Department.

Nearing the end of the series, Miyuki nearly broke her friendship with Natsumi after learning that the latter was being recruited into the Special Assault Team. The two patched up their differences when Miyuki told Natsumi that she wasn't open enough for her to accept Natsumi's recruitment into the SAT  since the two had acted like real friends, even like sisters when Miyuki explained that Natsumi's SAT recruitment happened so fast without her realizing it all along, which forced her to shield herself from seeing reality as it was. Miyuki also renewed her "friendship" with Nakajima, further opening their relationship to other possibilities.

Her partner is Saori Saga, who took over Natsumi's position after she was permanently stationed in the Tokyo Metropolitan Police Department branch as part of her duties as an SAT operative  before being transferred to the United States to conduct forensic training. 「Negative One Year Before Disappear of Megumi Yokota kun」

Reception
Miyuki was among the top 10 most popular female characters in the August 2001 issue of Newtype magazine.

References

See also
 Natsumi Tsujimoto

Female characters in anime and manga
Fictional Japanese people in anime and manga
Fictional female mechanics
Fictional characters from Chūgoku
Fictional Tokyo Metropolitan Police Department officers
Crime film characters
You're Under Arrest (manga)